The men's heavyweight (+87 kilograms) event at the 2014 Asian Games took place on 1 October 2014 at Ganghwa Dolmens Gymnasium, Incheon, South Korea.

Schedule
All times are Korea Standard Time (UTC+09:00)

Results

References

External links
Official website

Taekwondo at the 2014 Asian Games